King Biscuit Flower Hour Presents Streets is a 1983 recording of a Streets concert. The album features Streets live on their first tour, which was in support of the debut album on Atlantic Records. While the band featured the familiar voice of then ex-Kansas lead singer Steve Walsh, who recorded five Top 40 hits with Kansas up to that point, Streets stuck with original tunes even in a live setting such as this.

Track listing

* - "Shake Down," "I'm Not Alone Anymore" and "Streets of Desire" did not appear on either of the two streets albums.

Personnel
Mike Slamer - guitar
Steve Walsh - keyboards, lead vocals
Billy Greer - bass, backing and lead (6) vocals
Tim Gehrt - drums

See also
King Biscuit Flower Hour

References

Streets (band) albums
1997 live albums